The John E. Dwyer Technology Academy is a four-year comprehensive public high school serving students in ninth through twelfth grades in Elizabeth, in Union County, New Jersey, United States, as part of the Elizabeth Public Schools. The Technology Academy shares one large building with the Admiral William Halsey Leadership Academy, the Peter B. Gold Administration Building, and the Thomas Dunn Sports Center, which together form the Main Complex most commonly known as "The Main" to students and teachers. The Main complex holds more students, teachers, and administrators than the other high school in the city. It is known as the heart of all Elizabeth Academies.

The ninth-grade students of John E. Dwyer are housed in the Annex Building, which was originally located at 501 Union Ave Elizabeth, NJ 07208. Beginning in September 2022 the Annex Building will be moved to St. Anthony’s, located at 853 Third Avenue.

The school was named in honor of John E. Dwyer, an Elizabeth educator for many years who served as a teacher, guidance counselor, Vice Principal, Principal and as Superintendent of Schools.

The school has been accredited by the Middle States Association of Colleges and Schools Commission on Elementary and Secondary Schools since 2013.

As of the 2021–22 school year, the school had an enrollment of 1,405 students and 99.5 classroom teachers (on an FTE basis), for a student–teacher ratio of 14.1:1. There were 741 students (52.7% of enrollment) eligible for free lunch and 85 (6.0% of students) eligible for reduced-cost lunch.

Awards, recognition and rankings
The school was the 329th-ranked public high school in New Jersey out of 339 schools statewide in New Jersey Monthly magazine's September 2014 cover story on the state's "Top Public High Schools", using a new ranking methodology. The school had been ranked 306th in the state of 328 schools in 2012. This school has several national honor societies including: National Honor Society, National English Honor Society, Mu Alpha Theta Math Honor Society, National Art Honor Society, and Rho Kappa Social Studies Honor Society.

Curriculum
Students enrolled in the John E. Dwyer Technology Academy, in addition to completing a rigorous college preparatory program, will also be given the opportunity to explore careers in areas such as computer science, architectural design, and urban planning. The school program will also guide the participating students in pioneering the ways and means by which to integrate environmental technology into the world we live in. Honors and AP classes will be offered to all interested students. All John E. Dwyer Academy students will be expected to comply with the rules, regulations, and policies of the Academy and the school district.
 
Each John E. Dwyer Academy student will be given the opportunity to participate in one of the two strands of study offered:
 
 Students enrolling in the Industrial Technology Strand will participate in school and community activities that will give them a strong knowledge base regarding various fields that are relying more and more on technology and innovation every day. Courses offered will include classes in process technology, mechanical drafting, and architectural drafting
 Students enrolling in the Information Technology Strand will participate in classes and real-world activities dealing with such fields as robotics, computer science, and Cisco, Microsoft and other language and software systems. Participants in this strand will also learn about hardware design and computer infrastructure design and implementation. They will master the latest in computer management systems and data management operations
 
The Elizabeth Public Schools is partnering with The National Academy Foundation and is currently engaged in a Year of Planning - Academy Development Process to establish the Academy of Information Technology as a career academy at the John E. Dwyer Technology Academy in September 2010. The Academy of Information Technology prepares students for career opportunities in programming, database administration, web design and administration, digital networks, and other areas in the expanding digital workplace. Further, the district will be submitting a proposal to The National Academy Foundation to implement a new Academy theme in engineering in September 2011. The Academy of Engineering educates high school students in the principles of engineering, and providing content in the fields of electronics, biotech, aerospace, civil engineering, and architecture.

Graduation requirements

Subject	Class of 2010	Class of 2007/2008/2009
 	 
Language Arts	4 Years	4 Years
Social Studies	4 Years
World History
U.S. History I
U.S. History II
1 Elective	3 Years
World History
U.S. History I
U.S. History II
Math	4 Years
Algebra I
Geometry
Algebra II
Higher Math	3 Years
Algebra I
Geometry
Algebra II or Higher
Science	4 Years (Minimum of one science with a lab)	3 Years
World Language	3 Years World Languages
1 Year World Languages Literature	2 years
Fine/Performing/Practical Arts	2 Years	2 years
Phys Ed & Health	16 Credits	4 Years - One year for each year in attendance
Personal Finance	1 Credit	 
Career and Consumer, Family, Life Skills or Vocational-Technical Education	5 Credits	 
Community Service	60 Hours - 25 Hours of which is due during Senior year	 
Latin (Gifted and Talented only)	10 Credits 	
 	 	 
Credits	160	130
 	 
Testing	Pass HSPA/SRA	Pass HSPA/SRA

College Requirements:  All students who graduate from EHS will have taken the appropriate coursework to meet college entrance requirements.

The colleges (4 year colleges) require students to take 16 Carnagie Units in high school. A unit is considered a year of study.  Units are taken from the major subject areas of Language Arts, Social Studies, Mathematics, Science and World Language.

4 years of English		=	4 units
3 years of History		=	3 units
3 years of Mathematics (Algebra I, Geometry, Algebra II)		=	3 units
3 years of Science		=	3 units
2 years of World Language		=	2 units
Total Units	=	15 units

The additional unit is obtained by taking elective courses in Language Arts, Social Studies, Mathematics, Science or World Language.

EHS students are encouraged to participate in extra-curricular activities, take college entrance exams, and Advanced Placement Tests to strengthen their college applications.

Connection to the Main Complex

Some extracurricular activities and sports teams are found in Dwyer Academy. The building functions as a hub central as other students from the other Elizabeth Academies and Elizabeth High School come here during the after school hours. The Main Complex also holds Elizabeth High School's swimming pool where the swim team practices and meets are held. The Main Complex campus is the only one of the Elizabeth Academies to have a courtyard accessible to its students.

Athletics
Students from John E. Dywer Technology Academy and all the Elizabeth Academies (including Elizabeth High School) compete together on one consolidated set of sports teams against other schools outside the city.

Administration
The school's principal is Sulisnet Jimenez. The core administration team includes three vice principals.

References

External links
John E. Dwyer Technology Academy Website
Elizabeth Public Schools

Data for the Elizabeth Public Schools, National Center for Education Statistics

2009 establishments in New Jersey
Education in Elizabeth, New Jersey
Educational institutions established in 2009
Public high schools in Union County, New Jersey